Dinsmore may refer to:

Places
Dinsmore, Arkansas
Dinsmore, California
Dinsmore, Saskatchewan
Dinsmore Township, Shelby County, Ohio
Dinsmore, Texas

People
 Dinsmore (surname)
Dinsmore Alter, (1888-1968), American astronomer and meteorologist

Structures
Dinsmore Airport (disambiguation)
Dinsmore Bridge, in Richmond, British Columbia
Dinsmore Homestead, in Kentucky

Other uses
Dinsmore & Shohl, American law firm
Elsie Dinsmore, children's book series